Kate Price may refer to:

 Kate Price (musician), American hammered dulcimer player and vocalist
 Kate Price (actress) (1872–1943), Irish-born American actress

See also
Katie Price, English media personality, model and businesswoman